Basil Church may refer to:

 Basil Church (cricketer) (1849–1881), New Zealand cricketer
 Basil R. Church (1800–1858), Canadian political figure